The 1956 Maine gubernatorial election took place on September 10, 1956. Incumbent Democratic Governor Edmund Muskie was seeking re-election, and faced off against Republican Willis A. Trafton, Jr. in the general election.  Extremely popular, Muskie was able to easily win re-election.

Results

Notes

1956
Maine
Gubernatorial
September 1956 events in the United States